Pilgrim's Rest was a short lived British sitcom which aired for just one series of 6 episodes on BBC1 from 31 July – 4 September 1997.

Gary Olsen of 2point4 Children fame starred as Bob Payne. Recently divorced he sets up a roadside cafe named Pilgrim's Rest with his sister Tilly played by Gwen Taylor who is also divorced from Duncan played by John Duttine. The series follows Bob and Tilly along with their staff and several customers.

The series received average ratings and was cancelled after one series.

It was produced by Tiger Aspect.

Episodes

Each episode lasted for 30 minutes.

1. Pilot – 31 July 1997
2. Mo News Is Bad News – 7 August 1997
3. It's Good To Talk – 14 August 1997
4. Bill's Writing – 21 August 1997
5. Rock of Ages – 28 August 1997
6. Odd Against – 4 September 1997

Cast

Gary Olsen
Gwen Taylor
Jonathan Aris
John Arthur
Kara Underwood

External links

1997 British television series debuts
1997 British television series endings
1990s British sitcoms
English-language television shows
BBC television sitcoms